Dominique Badji (born October 16, 1992) is a Senegalese professional footballer who plays as a forward for Major League Soccer club FC Cincinnati.

Career

Early life
Born in Dakar, Senegal, Badji moved to Tanzania and Zimbabwe prior to moving to the United States to help further his education. Badji spent two years at Episcopal High School, a prestigious boarding school in Alexandria, Virginia on a full scholarship before eventually attending Boston University where he played soccer for the Boston University Terriers. While with the Terriers, Badji received many awards, the latest of which included 2014 All Region First Team Awards and the 2014 Patriot League Offensive Player of the Year award. Badji was one of the most athletic collegiate players heading into the MLS Combine in 2015 in Fort. Lauderdale, Florida, and his testing numbers on the first day backed it up. With a time of 3.98 secs in the 30-meter dash, 4.10 secs in the 5–10–5 agility and a vertical leap of 36 inches, Badji was the only athlete to score in the top 10 of each category.

Colorado Rapids
On 15 January 2015, Badji was selected by the Colorado Rapids as the 67th overall selection during the 2015 MLS SuperDraft. After impressing the coaching staff during pre-season, Badji was signed to a professional contract on March 4. Badji scored his first professional goal on April 10 against FC Dallas, ending a 600 minute goalless drought for the club, dating back to 2014. Badji's performance earned him a spot on the MLS Team of the Week alongside teammate Dillon Powers

FC Dallas 
On 23 July 2018, Badji was announced to be traded to FC Dallas for the midfielder and USMNT Player Kellyn Acosta. Badji made his debut for the club in August 2018 against the Seattle Sounders and scored. Dallas went on to lose that game 2–1. Badji was subbed on and started games for the club more frequently. He achieved a total of ten appearances for the club in the 2018 season.

Nashville SC 
On 2 December 2019, Nashville SC acquired Badji from FC Dallas in exchange for $175,000 in Targeted Allocation Money and $150,000 in General Allocation Money.

Return to Colorado Rapids
On 29 July 2021, Badji returned to Colorado Rapids, traded in exchange for up to $100,000 in General Allocation Money.

FC Cincinnati
On 4 January 2022, Badji signed a one-year deal with FC Cincinnati as a free agent.

Career statistics

References

External links 
 
 

1992 births
Living people
Senegalese footballers
Senegalese expatriate footballers
Boston University Terriers men's soccer players
Real Boston Rams players
Colorado Rapids players
FC Dallas players
Charlotte Independence players
Nashville SC players
FC Cincinnati players
Association football forwards
Footballers from Dakar
Senegalese expatriate sportspeople in the United States
Expatriate soccer players in the United States
Colorado Rapids draft picks
USL League Two players
Major League Soccer players
USL Championship players